Jon Cole may refer to:

Jon Cole (businessman), Texas businessman and anti-drug leader
Jon Cole (weightlifter) (born 1943), American powerlifter, weightlifter and strongman
Jon Cole of The Movies (band)
Jon Cole of Psyopus (band)
Jon Cole of Quill (band)
Jonathan Cole (British Army officer) (born 1967), British general

See also
Jonathan Cole (disambiguation)

John Cole (disambiguation)